Pollert may refer to:

 Chet Pollert (born 1955), American politician
 Emil Pollert (1877-1935), Czech opera singer born Emil Popper
 Emil Pollert (canoeist), Czechoslovak slalom canoeist who competed in the 1960s
 Jaroslav Pollert (canoeist born 1943), Czechoslovak slalom canoer who competed in 1960s and 1970s
 Jaroslav Pollert (canoeist born 1971), Czech slalom canoer who competed in 1990s and 2000s
 Lukáš Pollert (born 1970), Czech slalom canoeist who competed from the late 1980s to the early 2000s